William John Gallagher  was a Major League Baseball outfielder and pitcher. He played in the American Association for the 1883 Baltimore Orioles, in the National League for the 1883 Philadelphia Quakers and in the Union Association for the 1884 Philadelphia Keystones.

External links
Baseball Reference.com page

Philadelphia Quakers players
Philadelphia Keystones players
Baltimore Orioles (AA) players
Major League Baseball outfielders
Major League Baseball pitchers
Harrisburg (minor league baseball) players
Baseball players from Pennsylvania
19th-century baseball players
Date of birth missing
Date of death missing